Rabee Sufyani (Arabic: ربيع سفياني; born 26 January 1987) is a Saudi football player who plays as a winger for Jeddah.

Career statistics

International
Statistics accurate as of match played 10 August 2019.

International goals
Scores and results list Saudi Arabia's goal tally first.

Honours

Club
Al-Fateh
Pro League: 2012-13
Saudi Super Cup: 2013

Al-Nassr
Pro League: 2013–14
Saudi Crown Prince Cup: 2013–14

Al-Ittihad
Saudi Crown Prince Cup: 2016–17
King Cup: 2018

Al-Taawoun
King Cup: 2019

References

Saudi Arabian footballers
1987 births
Living people
Association football wingers
Al Hilal SFC players
Al-Fateh SC players
Al Nassr FC players
Al-Taawoun FC players
Ittihad FC players
Al-Ain FC (Saudi Arabia) players
Hajer FC players
Jeddah Club players
Sportspeople from Riyadh
Saudi First Division League players
Saudi Professional League players
Saudi Arabia international footballers